Rourke is a surname that refers to:
Allan Rourke (b. 1980), Canadian professional ice hockey player
Andy Rourke (b. 1964), English bass guitarist
Colin P. Rourke (b. 1943), British mathematician
Constance Rourke (1885–1941), American author and educator
James Rourke (1838–1914), Canadian lumber manufacturer and politician from New Brunswick
John Patrick Rourke (b. 1942), South African botanist
John Rourke (b. 1969), British Photographer and Videographer
Josie Rourke (b. 1976), British theatrical director
Mickey Rourke (b. 1952), American film actor
Nathan Rourke (b. 1998), Canadian professional football player
Russell A. Rourke (1931–2003), American government administrator; Secretary of the Air Force 1985–86

Fictional characters
 Dorothy Ann Rourke, one of the central characters of The Magic School Bus
Jack Rourke, protagonist of the 2011 video game Need for Speed: The Run
 Lyle Tiberius Rourke, main antagonist of the 2001 Disney film, Atlantis: The Lost Empire, voiced by James Garner

See also
 O'Rourke
 O'Rorke